Jindřich František Boblig z Edelstadtu (German: Heinrich Franz Boblig von Edelstadt) (1612 in Zlaté Hory;  – 27 January 1698) was a lawyer and imperial lay inquisitor who led the witch trials in Northern Moravia in the late 17th century.

He was active in the Šumperk region, particularly in the town of Velké Losiny. Boblig was responsible for burning of approximately 100 people accused of witchcraft. The list of executed included two priests who attempted to stop the trials, and Kryštof Lautner, Dean of Šumperk.

Biography 
Little is known about his early life. His father, Burgomaster in Zlaté Hory, was ennobled and received the mark of nobility "z Edelstadtu" (von Edelstadt, of Edelstadt) in 1591.

Jindřich Boblig studied law, probably in Vienna, but he did not complete his studies and later was titled only as juris candidatus. Until his participation in the witch trials of the Šumperk region, he probably led a law practice in Olomouc.

Witch trials

References 

1612 births
1698 deaths
17th-century Austrian lawyers
Inquisitors
Moravian nobility
People from Zlaté Hory
Silesian nobility
Witch hunters
Moravian-German people